"Way of Life" is Slinkee Minx's fourth single and was released on 9 June 2007 through Australian record label Central Station Records.  The single peaked at #13 on the Finnish Singles Chart, #60 Aria Physical Charts (Australia) and #21 on the Aria Dance Charts (Australia).

Track listing
 "Way of Life" (Radio Edit) – 3:39
 "Way of Life" (KC Baker Radio Edit) – 3:18
 "Way of Life" – 4:30
 "Way of Life" (KC Baker Club Mix) – 6:46
 "Way of Life" (Acoustic) – 3:33

References

External links

 

2007 singles
Electronic songs
House music songs
Slinkee Minx songs
2007 songs